The second and final season of Stargate Universe was announced by Syfy on December 13, 2009. Like the first season, the second season consisted of 20 episodes. The series was moved from the franchise's long history of Friday to Tuesday, along with Caprica, as Syfy had picked up WWE Friday Night SmackDown. The series resumed on September 28, 2009, USA. In Ireland & UK, the series resumed on October 5 at 9pm on Sky1 and Sky1 HD. 

Syfy announced on December 16, 2010 that it would not be picking Stargate Universe up for a third season and that the Spring 2011 season would be the last to air on its channel.

Main cast
 Starring Robert Carlyle as Dr. Nicholas Rush
 Louis Ferreira as Colonel Everett Young
 Brian J. Smith as First Lieutenant Matthew Scott
 Elyse Levesque as Chloe Armstrong
 David Blue as Eli Wallace
 Alaina Huffman as First Lieutenant Tamara Johansen
 With Jamil Walker Smith as Master Sergeant Ronald Greer
 And Ming-Na as Camile Wray

Episodes

Ratings 
The season premiere drew 1.175 million viewers in the US, lower than any episode in Season 1.  Through its second season, SGU viewership continued to decline, falling below 1 million by the fourth episode and measuring only 0.814 million viewers for its thirteenth episode. Series co-creator Brad Wright attributed this decline to its change in timeslot (from Friday night to Tuesday night, and then again to Monday night), stating: 

Syfy announced on December 16, 2010 that it would not be picking Stargate Universe up for a third season.

Reaction to Cancellation 
After the cancellation of Stargate Universe, Stargate fans reacted angrily towards Syfy. On May 12, 2011, Syfy released a letter explaining its reasons for the series' cancellation.  The letter discussed the fact that ratings during the first season had fallen significantly on the Friday timeslot, dropping over 25% of its viewership during the long hiatus between the first and second half of the season.  This prompted Syfy to start the second season in the Tuesday slot making room on Friday for wrestling. Despite Stargate Universe being jerked to Tuesday, the show managed to keep 75% of its audience. Despite this, SyFy cancelled the show replacing it again with wrestling.

Media releases

See also 
 List of Stargate Universe episodes

References

External links

 Season 2 on GateWorld
 Season 2 on IMDb

 
2010 Canadian television seasons
2011 American television seasons
Universe 02
2011 Canadian television seasons